Shon Ju-il (Korean: 손 주일 ; born 6 October 1969) is a South Korean former sprinter who specialised in the 400 metres. He represented his country at the 1996 Summer Olympics as well as two outdoor and one indoor World Championships. In addition, he won a silver medal at the 1994 Asian Games.

His personal bests in the event are 45.37 seconds outdoors (Seoul 1994) and 46.88 seconds indoors (Tianjin 1996). Both results are standing national records.

International competitions

References

1969 births
Living people
South Korean male sprinters
Athletes (track and field) at the 1996 Summer Olympics
Olympic athletes of South Korea
Athletes (track and field) at the 1994 Asian Games
Athletes (track and field) at the 1998 Asian Games
Asian Games medalists in athletics (track and field)
Asian Games gold medalists for South Korea
Asian Games silver medalists for South Korea
Asian Games bronze medalists for South Korea
Medalists at the 1994 Asian Games
Medalists at the 1998 Asian Games
20th-century South Korean people

ko:손주일